Comadia arenae is a moth in the family Cossidae. It is found in North America, where it has been recorded from California.

The wingspan is 13–17 mm. The forewings are whitish-grey with some brown scales. The hindwings are mouse grey. Adults have been recorded on wing from June to July.

References

Natural History Museum Lepidoptera generic names catalog

Cossinae
Moths described in 1975
Moths of North America